Andreas Gustaf Engqvist (born December 23, 1987) is a Swedish former professional ice hockey centre who last played with Djurgårdens IF of the SHL, his second tenure with the club. He recently played for the Salavat Yulaev Ufa of the KHL.

Playing career
Björn Ericsson, general manager of Järfälla HC, recommended Djurgården to have a look at Engqvist, mentioning that Engqvist reminded him of Mats Sundin.

On July 13, 2009, Engqvist signed a three-year contract with the Montreal Canadiens in the NHL. During the 2009–10 season he played on loan for Djurgårdens IF in the Swedish Elitserien. On January 21, 2011, he played his first NHL game with the Montreal Canadiens, a 7–1 away win against the Ottawa Senators.

On June 17, 2012, Engvist signed a one-year deal with Atlant Moscow Oblast of the KHL. Having signed as a restricted free agent, the Montreal Canadiens retained his rights. After three seasons in the KHL with Moscow Oblast and HC CSKA Moscow, Engqvist opted to continue with his third KHL club, following a trade to Salavat Yulaev Ufa on June 18, 2015.

In the midst of his second season with Salavat in 2016–17, Engqvist appeared in 12 games for 11 points before suffering a season-ending injury on September 22, 2016. Opting to continue his rehabilitation in his native Sweden, he mutually agreed to terminate his contract with the club on December 19, 2016.

During the 2017–18 SHL season, Enqvist signed with Djurgårdens IF.

International play 

Engqvist has played 9 games for Sweden's national ice hockey team at the 2010 World Championships, helping claim the bronze medal.

Career statistics

Regular season and playoffs

International

Awards and achievements

Nordic Trophy
 Player of tournament 2009

References

External links

1987 births
Living people
Atlant Moscow Oblast players
HC CSKA Moscow players
Djurgårdens IF Hockey players
Expatriate ice hockey players in Russia
Hamilton Bulldogs (AHL) players
Montreal Canadiens players
Salavat Yulaev Ufa players
Ice hockey people from Stockholm
Undrafted National Hockey League players
Swedish ice hockey centres